Zombie Spring Breakers (previously Ibiza Undead) is a 2016 horror film written and directed by Andy Edwards. Premiered at London's FrightFest Film Festival in August 2016, the film stars  Cara Theobold and Matt King. The story follows a similar plot to 2013's Go Goa Gone.

Synopsis
A group of young people head to Ibiza for the holiday of a lifetime – only to find a zombie outbreak getting in the way. In the world of Ibiza Undead zombies are commonplace and a new strain of virus has started appearing across the globe, rendering its victims as flesh-eating maniacs. Britain has been severely affected, but zombie are managed and frequent checks ensure that no virus carriers make it across the borders. Club owner Karl (Matt King) decides that deranged podium dancing zombies are just what he needs for his Ibiza nightclub, so he commissions a boat full of them to be smuggled in. His plan backfires and his 'cargo' ends up in the Mediterranean. But the undead don’t stay dead, and when they make their way ashore the holiday paradise of Ibiza soon begins to resemble a war zone. Oblivious to these events, a gang of young British men - Jim, Alex and Az  arrive on the island intent on a good time.

Other cast members include Cara Theobold as Alex's former girlfriend Ellie, Inbetweeners star Emily Atack as Alex’s older sister Liz, Algina Lipskis as Zara, and movie pundit Alex Zane who makes a cameo as a club promoter.

Cast
 Cara Theobold as Ellie
 Emily Atack as Liz
 Algina Lipskis as Zara
 Jordan Coulson as Alex
 Homer Todiwala as Az 
 Ed Kear as Big Jim
 Matt King as Karl
 Marcia do Vales as Maria
 Matt Kennard as Rupert
 Alex Felton as Todd
 Michael Wagg as Torval
 Alex Zane as club host
 Chris Simmons as beach cafe owner 
 Seb Castang as Antonio
 Simon Brandon as Kenneth
 Callum Darcy as a zombie

Reception
Hollywood News felt that the story moved along nicely but had too many characters, including Big Jim who they found 'a little too crass and sex-obsessed to win the audience over'. Bloody Disgusting gave it three and a half skulls out of five saying "This isn’t a great film by any stretch of the imagination, but I enjoyed it a lot more than I’d care to admit...It’s not exactly Shaun of the Dead, but Zombie Spring Breakers is definitely worth a watch."

Jessy Williams of Scream magazine panned the film, writing "All in all, Ibiza Undead is a disappointment. What could have been a self-aware, fun and witty romantic zomedy is merely a predictable mess that only serves to secure my general distaste of horror-comedies that only use sex and alcohol to generate laughs." Wicked Horror also disliked the film saying "Unfortunately, Ibiza Undead is mostly, like the lads at the centre of it all, a bit useless. It isn’t particularly funny and the horror elements aren’t strong enough to justify it as a real zombie movie."

References

External links
 
 

2016 films
2016 horror films
British zombie films
2010s English-language films
2010s British films